Vilnius BASIC is a dialect of the BASIC programming language running on the Elektronika BK-0010-01/BK-0011M and UKNC computers.

It was a quite advanced BASIC and, instead of being an interpreter like most systems of the day, featured a runtime threaded code compiler that compiled the program when one entered the RUN command. The dialect was very close to MSX BASIC. The major differences were the lack of the PLAY, SOUND, VPOKE and PUT SPRITE operators, the inability to open several files at the same time, and the inability to use more than one operator on one line. Only the UKNC version had a full-screen editor. Machine-dependent features, like graphics operators parameters  and PEEK/POKE addresses were also different.

The software was developed at Vilnius University, located in Lithuania which was a republic of the Soviet Union at the time.

See also 
 List of BASIC dialects
 List of BASIC dialects by platform

References

External links

BASIC programming language
Computing in the Soviet Union
Soviet inventions
BASIC, Vilnius
Vilnius
Vilnius University
BASIC programming language family